Alfonse Chigamoy Owiny-Dollo is a Ugandan lawyer and judge. He has been the Chief Justice of Uganda since 20 August 2020.

He served as the Acting Chief Justice of Uganda from  22 June 2020 and was a deputy Chief Justice from 30 September 2017. He had been appointed to that position in August 2017, replacing Steven Kavuma, who attained the mandatory retirement age of 70 years on 29 September 2017.

Background and education
He was born on 18 January 1956 in present-day Agago District. He attended King’s College Budo and Nabumali High School for his O’Level and A’Level education respectively. He holds a Bachelor of Laws from Makerere University and a Diploma in Legal Practice, from the Law Development Centre in Kampala, Uganda's largest city and capital. His Master of Arts in conflict resolution, was obtained from the University of Bradford in the United Kingdom. He also has a certificate in advanced conflict mediation skills, obtained from the Center for Conflict Resolution in Cape Town, South Africa.

Career
In 1988, Owiny-Dollo served as legal counsel in the peace talks between the then rebel outfit, Uganda People's Democratic Movement (UPDM), and the government of Uganda. In that capacity, he wrote the peace agreement executed between the government and UPDM, on 3 June 1988, at Pece Stadium, in Gulu.

From 1994 until 1996, he was a member of the Constituent Assembly that drafted the 1995 Uganda Constitution. He also served as a member of parliament, representing Agago County in the 6th Parliament (1996–2001). During the talks between the Lord's Resistance Army and the National Resistance Movement government of Uganda, from 2006 until 2008, Owiny-Dollo served as legal counsel to Reik Machar, the Vice President of South Sudan, who mediated the talks.

In 2008, he was appointed to the High Court of Uganda, serving in that capacity until 2015.

In 2015, Owiny-Dollo, was promoted to the Court of Appeal of Uganda. However, he couldn't immediately take up his appointment because he was hearing a terrorism case in the High Court, in which 13 men were accused of killing 76 people in twin bombings in Kampala in 2010. He disposed of that case in May 2016.

In August 2017, the president of Uganda, appointed Owiny-Dollo, as the Deputy Chief Justice and under Ugandan law, the head of Uganda's Court of Appeal and Uganda's Constitutional Court.

On 20 August 2020, the president of Uganda  Yoweri Kaguta  Museveni appointed him as the 13th Chief Justice of Uganda, replacing Bart Magunda Katureebe, who clocked the mandatory retirement age of 70, on 19 June 2020.

Family
Justice Owiny-Dollo is married to three wives with children and one of the wives is Florence Nakachwa Dollo-Owiny the Deputy Director of Law Development Center.

See also
 Judiciary of Uganda

References

External links
Justice Owiny Dollo warns court bailiffs

Ugandan judges
1956 births
Living people
Acholi people
Law Development Centre alumni
Makerere University alumni
Alumni of the University of Bradford
People from Agago District
People from Northern Region, Uganda
Chief justices of Uganda
Deputy Chief Justices of Uganda
Justices of the Court of Appeal of Uganda